Roland and Rattfink is an American series of animated shorts produced and released from 1967 to 1972. The main characters also made several guest appearances on The Pink Panther animated series. The series was produced by David H. DePatie and Friz Freleng.

Plot 
The cartoons concerned blond, muscular, good-looking, pacifist "good guy" Roland and the many attempts by the evil, weedy, green-skinned (in most of the cartoons), mustachioed Rattfink to defeat or dispose of him.

Roland and Rattfink were both voiced by Lennie Weinrib (except in "The Deadwood Thunderball" where they were voiced by John Byner and Dave Barry).

"Hurts and Flowers" (one long, running joke about Rattfink destroying Roland's daisies) concludes with Rattfink getting killed and Roland leaving a daisy in a flowerpot on his grave. When Roland walks away, Rattfink's ghost rises from the grave to throw the flowerpot at him. Seventeen cartoons were produced.

Filmography

Home video 
The series was released January 27, 2009 on DVD from MGM Home Entertainment/20th Century Fox Home Entertainment as a part of The Pink Panther Classic Cartoon Collection. The individual shorts were released on DVD and Blu-Ray on June 28, 2016 by Kino Lorber, and are also available to stream on Hulu.

See also 
 List of The Pink Panther cartoons

References

External links 
 Roland and Rattfink at the Big Cartoon Database.
 Roland and Ratfink [sic] at Don Markstein's Toonopedia. Archived from the original on January 19, 2017.

Animated film series
Fictional duos
Film series introduced in 1967
DePatie–Freleng Enterprises
Television series by MGM Television
The Pink Panther Show